Lord & Schryver was the first landscape architecture firm run by women in the Pacific Northwest. It was founded by Elizabeth Blodget Lord and Edith Schryver. It was headquartered in Salem, Oregon, running from 1929 to 1969. The firm designed more than 200 gardens.

References 

Landscape architecture
Landscape design history of the United States
Companies based in Salem, Oregon
American companies established in 1929